Vandas is a surname. Notable people with the surname include:

Michael Vandas (born 1991), Slovak ice hockey player
Tomáš Vandas (born 1969), Czech politician

See also
Vanda (disambiguation)